Neolamprologus cancellatus is a species of cichlid endemic to Lake Tanganyika where it is usually found in the Wonzye Point area of Zambia.    This species can reach a length of  TL.  This species can also be found in the aquarium trade.

References

 

cancellatus
Taxa named by Kazuhiro Nakaya
Fish described in 2005
Fish of Lake Tanganyika